The 1943 Columbia Lions football team was an American football team that represented Columbia University as an independent during the 1943 college football season. 

In their 14th season under head coach Lou Little, the Lions compiled a 0–8 record, and were outscored 313 to 33 by opponents. Tomas S. Rock was the team's captain.  

Columbia played its home games at Baker Field in Upper Manhattan, in New York City.

Schedule

References

Columbia
Columbia Lions football seasons
College football winless seasons
Columbia Lions football